Abraham Yeshayahu (Avi) Kushnir (born 26 August 1960) is an Israeli comedian, actor and host.

Early life
During high school Kushnir studied at the youth village HaKfar HaYarok. Afterwards, during his mandatory military service, Kushnir served in an Infantry unit. After his army service Kushnir worked as a stagehand and later on began directing plays.

Career
His professional career as an actor began in the early 1980s when he began performing in stand-up shows. In 1985 Kushnir hosted the Festigal, an annual Israeli singing show alongside Gadi Yagil.

In 1987, while he was 27 years old, Kushnir represented Israel in the 1987 Eurovision Song Contest along with Nathan Dattner, as part of the comedic duo HaBatlanim (lit. The Bums), with the comical song Shir Habatlanim which ended up in the 8th place.

Filmography

Film and Television

Theater

Personal life 
Kushnir is married and has two sons and a daughter. Kushnir's son Yotam is an actor, and he has played among others in the TV series "Alifim" (אליפים).

References

External links
 

1960 births
Living people
Israeli entertainers
Israeli male comedians
Place of birth missing (living people)
People from Central District (Israel)
Israeli male stage actors
Israeli male film actors
Israeli male television actors
Eurovision Song Contest entrants for Israel
Eurovision Song Contest entrants of 1987